Manuherikia may refer to the following in New Zealand:
 Manuherikia (genus), genus of Miocene ducks
 Manuherikia Group, sediments (geological terminology)
 Manuherikia (New Zealand electorate), former electorate (1866–1870)
 Manuherikia River, a river in Central Otago
 Manuherikia Valley in Central Otago